The following days are public holidays in Vatican City, as published each year by the Prefecture of the Pontifical Household. These largely correspond to events in the liturgical year of the Catholic Church.

In addition, all Sundays of the year are public holidays as well.

By tradition, both the election anniversary and the name day for the civilian name of the reigning pope are public holidays. The Solemnities of the Ascension of Christ and Corpus Christi have not been listed since 2009.

See also
Index of Vatican City-related articles

References

Vatican City
Vatican City culture
Vatican City